ERG S.p.A. is a publicly listed Italian energy company, founded in 1938, and based in Genoa, Italy.

History

ERG was founded by Edoardo Guida Garrone in 1938, founding a company for the refining of petroleum. In 1952, ERG signs an agreement to refine the oil on behalf of BP.

During the 1960s and 1970s the company started to build some oil refineries and pipelines in Italy, particularly a pipeline in Arquata Scrivia and an oil refinery in Priolo Gargallo (ISAB).

In the 1980s ERG acquired the petrol stations networks owned by Elf, Chevron, and BP in Italy, through ERG Petroli.

Since 1997 the company is listed on the Italian Stock Exchange. In 1999 it opened gas, (petrol), stations network in Spain through ERG Petroleos, sold in 2008 to Saras S.p.A.

In 2007 ERG started to operate in the French and German wind markets, acquiring wind farms also in Bulgaria, Romania, Polonia and United Kingdom.

In 2008 it signed an agreement with Lukoil, sharing the 49% of oil refinery in Priolo Gargallo.

In 2009 it launched its own Mobile virtual network operator: ERG Mobile, becoming the first Italian oil company with its own telecommunications company.

In 2010 ERG Petroli and TotalErg Italia merged to become TotalErg and started operation on October 1, 2010.

In early 2011 ERG reduced its share in ISAB from 51% to 40%. Two years later ERG completed the exit from the refining sector.
 
In the meantime (since 2010) ERG grew in the Italian wind power sector becoming the leading wind operator in Italy in 2013.

In 2015 ERG entered the hydroelectric sector, via acquisition of E.On's Italian assets, with 527 MW of capacity. The power plants are located in the Italian regions of Umbria, Marche and Lazio.
 
In January 2018, ERG completed the closing with the Api Group regarding the sale of its 51% shareholding in TotalErg S.p.A., completing its industrial transformation process towards renewables. In the same year, ERG entered the solar power business through the acquisition of 89 MW (30 photovoltaic plants) in Italy.

Profile
Following a period of profound transformation (sale of the ISAB refinery and of the ISAB Energy power station, creation and sale of the TotalErg joint venture and the sale of the ERG Oil Sicilia network), ERG Group is now the leading operator in wind energy in Italy and is currently among the top ten in Europe (onshore). ERG is also active in Italy in the generation of electricity from solar sources (140 MW).

As regards the geographic distribution of wind farms, the MW installed are mainly in Italy (1,093), where other ERG's Operations & Maintenance logistics centres are also located.
ERG is present with 359 MW in France, 272 MW in Germany, in Romania (70 MW) and in Bulgaria (54 MW). Over the course of 2015, wind farms in Poland became operational (approximately 80 MW).

With regard to sustainability issues, in October 2022, Standard Ethics Aei upgraded ERG's sustainability rating to "E+" with a positive outlook on a scale of F to EEE within the SE European Utilities Index.

Sponsorship
ERG was the main sponsor of U.C. Sampdoria (until 2011), a football club that was owned by the Garrone family (Riccardo Garrone was the chairman, with Edoardo as the vice-chairman, and Vittorio as director), for more than 9 years.

References

External links
 ERG official website

Companies based in Genoa
Italian brands
Oil and gas companies of Italy
Energy companies established in 1938
Automotive fuel retailers
Filling stations
Non-renewable resource companies established in 1938